Eoin Downey (born 2003) is an Irish hurler who plays for Cork Senior Championship club Glen Rovers and at inter-county level with the Cork senior hurling team. He usually lines out in defence.

Career

Downey first played hurling as a schoolboy with Christian Brothers College in Cork, with whom he lined out in the Harty Cup. He also played at juvenile and underage levels with the Glen Rovers club before becoming a member of the starting fifteen on the club's senior team in 2021. 

Downey first appeared on the inter-county scene as a member of the Cork minor hurling team in 2019 and was team captain in 2020. He subsequently progressed onto the Cork under-20 hurling team and lined out when Cork beat Galway in the 2021 All-Ireland U20 final. 

Downey joined his brother Robert on the Cork senior hurling team in mid-May 2022. He made his first competitive start in the first round of the 2023 National League.

Career statistics

Honours

Cork
All-Ireland Under-20 Hurling Championship: 2021
Munster Under-20 Hurling Championship: 2021

References

2003 births
Living people
Glen Rovers hurlers
St Nicholas' Gaelic footballers
Cork inter-county hurlers